Khirbet Kuwayzibah, also Kuzibah, Kueiziba, is an ancient ruin, partly inhabited, in the Hebron Governorate in the West Bank, presently part of  Sa'ir.

Etymology 
Edward Henry Palmer noted in 1881 that Khurbet Kueiziba could possibly be a modern derivation of the  Hebrew placename Chozeba.

History 
The site is dated to classic antiquity, and usually identified with Chozeba, also Kuseva - the place of origin of Simon Bar Kokhba. 
At the foot of the ruin are several springs, known as 'Ain Kueiziba, along which are the remains of ancient pools. These springs are the source of water for the Arrub aqueduct, which together with other aqueduct supplied the water to the Roman aqueduct to Jerusalem. 

In 2009, several residents of Kuwayzibah were interviewed for a Channel 1 article about Tzvi Misinai and admitted they are of Jewish descent.

See also
 Betar (fortress)

References

Bibliography

 (pp. 312-313, 358)

External links
Welcome To Kh. Kuweiziba
Survey of Western Palestine, Map 21:    IAA, Wikimedia commons

Archaeological sites in the West Bank
Former populated places in the State of Palestine
Ancient Jewish settlements of Judaea
130s disestablishments in the Roman Empire
Palestinian people of Jewish descent